Stanley Griffiths Moss (1879–1957) was a British actor, mainly in supporting roles.

Life

He was born Stanley George Moss on 1 July 1879 in Gloucester.

In the 1920s he appears as leader of Catlin's Royal Pierrots at Lea's Pavilion in Folkestone. Around the same time he turned his hand to writing music, composing a foxtrot: "Under the Shadow of The Orme". He appears to have spent his life in the entertainment industry, mainly vaudeville, and only entered the film industry after the Second World War at age 67.

He died in Lambeth London on 14 August 1957 aged 78.

Film Roles
see
The Laughing Lady (1946) as Major Domo
Woman to Woman (1947) as Sylvia's butler
Dual Alibi (1947) as the actor
Portrait of Clare (1950) as Bates

References

1879 births
1957 deaths
People from Gloucester
British male film actors
20th-century British male actors